Hot Country Songs and Country Airplay are charts that rank the top-performing country music songs in the United States, published by Billboard magazine. Hot Country Songs ranks songs based on digital downloads, streaming, and airplay not only from country stations but from stations of all formats, a methodology introduced in 2012. Country Airplay, which was published for the first time in 2012, is based solely on country radio airplay, a methodology that had previously been used for several decades for Hot Country Songs.

Both charts began the year with "Speechless" by Dan + Shay retaining the top spot from the final chart of 2018. The song remained atop the airplay chart for the first two weeks of 2019 before being replaced by "Good Girl" by Dustin Lynch, and held the top spot on Hot Country Songs for a further two weeks before Dan + Shay replaced themselves at number one with "Tequila". The latter song broke the record for the longest time taken to climb to number one on the Hot Country Songs chart, reaching the top spot in its 54th week on the listing. It reached the top of the chart more than six months after it had been number one on Country Airplay, and marked the first time for five years that an act had replaced itself at number one on Hot Country Songs. In early March, Luke Combs reached the top of both charts with "Beautiful Crazy" and topped both listings simultaneously for seven weeks. Industry observers reported that the track would have been replaced at number one on Hot Country Songs in early April by rapper Lil Nas X's song "Old Town Road" had Billboard not taken the decision to remove that track after its first week on the listing, contending that it did not sufficiently fit the country genre.  This decision caused controversy: one former music label executive claimed that a similar track by a white artist would have been treated differently.

Three songs tied for the year's longest unbroken run atop the Hot Country Songs chart.  "Beautiful Crazy" held the top spot for eleven consecutive weeks, a figure matched by both "The Git Up" by Blanco Brown and the year's final number one on the listing, "10,000 Hours", on which Dan + Shay collaborated with Canadian pop singer Justin Bieber.  Dan + Shay thus spent a total of 19 weeks at number one in 2019, the most by any act.  "The Git Up" spent twelve weeks in total at number one but non-consecutively, being interrupted for a single week by "God's Country" by Blake Shelton.  The seven-week run at number one on Country Airplay achieved by "Beautiful Crazy" was the year's longest unbroken spell atop that listing and the longest-running country number one based on radio plays since Tim McGraw's "Live Like You Were Dying" in 2004.  Combs achieved two further airplay chart-toppers with "Beer Never Broke My Heart" in August and "Even Though I'm Leaving" in November.  When the former song reached number one, Combs achieved the feat of topping Billboards radio-based country chart with his first six singles, something which no other act had achieved since the magazine began publishing a chart using that methodology in 1990. Combs tied with Thomas Rhett for the most number ones during the year, with three each. However, Rhett spent significantly less time at number one, topping the chart for three weeks compared to Combs' twelve. Dan + Shay, Jason Aldean, and Old Dominion were the only other acts to chart more than one number one song during 2019, with two each. In August, Maren Morris reached number one on the airplay chart with "Girl", the first chart-topper by a female vocalist for 17 months.  The under-representation of female artists on the playlists of country radio stations had become a hot topic; an academic study published earlier in the year found that between 2000 and 2018 the proportion of airplay on country stations for songs by women fell from 33% to 11%.

Chart history

See also
2019 in music
List of artists who reached number one on the U.S. country chart
List of Top Country Albums number ones of 2019

References

2019
Number-one country singles
United States Country Singles